Valentine Blake (1560–1635) was an Irish merchant and Mayor of Galway.

Valentine Blake may also refer to:

Sir Valentine Blake, 3rd Baronet (d. 1652)
Sir Valentine Blake, 5th Baronet (d. c. 1672), of the Blake baronets
Sir Valentine Blake, 12th Baronet, MP for Galway Borough (UK Parliament constituency), of the Blake baronets
Sir Valentine Blake, 14th Baronet (1836–1912), of the Blake baronets

See also
Blake (surname)